"I Remember Elvis Presley (The King Is Dead)" is a song co-written by Dick Bakker, Eddy Ouwens and Dunhills, performed by Ouwens under the name of Danny Mirror. The song was dedicated to Elvis Presley stating he is the one and only king." It reached number 4 in the UK Singles Chart in October 1977.

In 1977, Canadian singer Johnny Farago (1944-1997) made a cover version in French as Je me souviens d’Elvis Presley and an english cover with the same lyrics I remember Elvis Presley.

Charts

Weekly charts

Year-end charts

References

1977 singles
Dutch Top 40 number-one singles
European Hot 100 Singles number-one singles
Number-one singles in Sweden
Songs about Elvis Presley
1977 songs
Songs written by Eddy Ouwens